Rhabdamia is a genus of cardinalfishes native to the Indian and Pacific Oceans.

Species
The recognized species in this genus are:
 Rhabdamia clupeiformis M. C. W. Weber, 1909
 Rhabdamia gracilis (Bleeker, 1856) (luminous cardinalfish)
 Rhabdamia nigrimentum (J. L. B. Smith, 1961)
 Rhabdamia nuda (Regan, 1905)
 Rhabdamia spilota G. R. Allen & Kuiter, 1994 (Indonesian doubles cardinalfish)

References

Apogoninae
Marine fish genera
Taxa named by Max Carl Wilhelm Weber